The Girl and the Greaser is a 1913 American silent short film directed by Allan Dwan starring Charlotte Burton, J. Warren Kerrigan, Louise Lester, George Periolat, Jack Richardson and Vivian Rich.

External links

1913 films
American silent short films
American black-and-white films
Films directed by Allan Dwan
1910s American films